I Used to Know Her is the second compilation album by American R&B singer H.E.R., released on August 30, 2019, by RCA Records. The album comprises songs from the singer's EPs I Used to Know Her: The Prelude (2018) and I Used to Know Her: Part 2 (2018), and includes five additional songs, as well as extended editions of the songs "Going", "Be on My Way", and "Lord Is Coming".

The compilation received an Album of the Year nomination at the 62nd Grammy Awards, marking H.E.R.'s second consecutive nomination in that category. The Bryson Tiller-featured single "Could've Been" received nominations for Best R&B Song and Best R&B Performance, and "Hard Place" received nominations for Song of the Year and Record of the Year.

Singles and promotion 

On April 4, 2019, she released the music video for "Hard Place". She also performed the song live on The Late Show with Stephen Colbert, and the 2019 Grammy Awards. On June 25, the first promotional single "Racks" was released featuring YBN Cordae. The next promotional single was released on July 26, titled "21".

Accolades

Track listing

Personnel 
Credits adapted from Tidal.

Musicians

 David "Swagg R'celious" Harris – programming , drums , keyboards 
 Dernst "D'Mile" Emile II – bass, guitar 
 Keith "Bassman" Foster – bass 
 Sam Ashworth – guitar 
 H.E.R. – acoustic guitar 
 Jack Rochon – electric guitar 
 Alonzo "Zo" Harris – organ , piano , strings 
 Karina Pasian – background vocals 
 Phillip Lewis – keyboards 
 Rodney "Darkchild" Jerkins – keyboards 
 Ajanee Hambrick – background vocals 
 Malik Spence – background vocals 
 Melody Giron – cello 
 Carrington Brown – drums 
 Ervin Dede – viola 
 Marissa Licata – violin 
 Sarah Koenig-Plonskier – violin 
 Scott Mulvahill – bass 

Technical

 Dave Kutch – mastering engineer 
 Colin Leonard – mastering engineer 
 Miki Tsutsumi – mixing engineer , recording engineer 
 Jaycen Joshua – mixing engineer 
 Phil Tan – mixing engineer 
 Dernst "D'Mile" Emile II – recording engineer 
 Omar Loya – recording engineer 
 Victor Pereyra – recording engineer 
 Derek Keota – recording engineer 
 Joseph Hurtado – recording engineer 
 Carl Barc – recording engineer 
 Ciel Eckard-Lee – recording engineer 
 Bill Zimmerman – engineer 
 Ayana Depas – assistant engineer 
 Jaron Bozeman – assistant engineer 
 Jacob Richards – assistant engineer 
 Michael Seaberg – assistant engineer 
 Rashawn Mclean – assistant engineer 
 Phillip Martelly – assistant engineer 
 Ben Fusel – assistant engineer 
 Sean Klein – assistant engineer 
 DJ Riggins – assistant engineer

Charts

Certifications

References 

2019 compilation albums
Albums produced by D'Mile
Albums produced by Rodney Jerkins
Albums produced by T-Minus (record producer)
Contemporary R&B compilation albums
RCA Records compilation albums
H.E.R. albums